Donald Robertson (born 1 January 1987) is a Scottish football referee. He began refereeing in 2011, and has been a FIFA referee since 2017. Before his refereeing career, Robertson was a player with Partick Thistle, Queen's Park and St. Mirren.

Career
Don Robertson first began refereeing in 2011. Since then (as of June 2020), he has made 268 refereeing appearances, given 790 yellow cards and 51 red cards.

Robertson was chosen to referee the first Qualifying round of the UEFA Champions League in 2019. The game took place on 9 July 2019 in Tallinn, Estonia between Nõmme Kalju FC and KF Shkëndija. KF Shkëndija won 0–1.

References

1987 births
Living people
Scottish football referees
UEFA Champions League referees
Scottish Professional Football League referees